The following species in the flowering plant genus Cyrtandra are accepted by Plants of the World Online. Many of the species are rare endemics on islands in the Malesia region.

Cyrtandra aclada 
Cyrtandra acutangula 
Cyrtandra adnata 
Cyrtandra aeruginosa 
Cyrtandra agrihanensis 
Cyrtandra agusanensis 
Cyrtandra × alata 
Cyrtandra albertisii 
Cyrtandra albibracteata 
Cyrtandra albiflora 
Cyrtandra × alnea 
Cyrtandra alnifolia 
Cyrtandra aloisiana 
Cyrtandra alvarezii 
Cyrtandra × ambigua 
Cyrtandra amicta 
Cyrtandra ammitophila 
Cyrtandra ampla 
Cyrtandra amplifolia 
Cyrtandra andersonii 
Cyrtandra aneiteensis 
Cyrtandra angularis 
Cyrtandra angustielliptica 
Cyrtandra angustivenosa 
Cyrtandra anisophylla 
Cyrtandra anisopoda 
Cyrtandra anthropophagorum 
Cyrtandra antoniana 
Cyrtandra antuana 
Cyrtandra apaensis 
Cyrtandra apiculata 
Cyrtandra apoensis 
Cyrtandra arachnoidea 
Cyrtandra arborescens 
Cyrtandra arbuscula 
Cyrtandra areolata 
Cyrtandra arfakensis 
Cyrtandra argentata 
Cyrtandra argentii 
Cyrtandra × arguta 
Cyrtandra asikii 
Cyrtandra atherocalyx 
Cyrtandra athrocarpa 
Cyrtandra × atomigyna 
Cyrtandra atrichoides 
Cyrtandra atrichos 
Cyrtandra atropurpurea 
Cyrtandra attenuata 
Cyrtandra augusti 
Cyrtandra aundensis 
Cyrtandra aurantiaca 
Cyrtandra aurantiicarpa 
Cyrtandra aurea 
Cyrtandra aureosericea 
Cyrtandra aureotincta 
Cyrtandra auriculata 
Cyrtandra axillantha 
Cyrtandra axillaris 
Cyrtandra × axilliflora 
Cyrtandra bacanii 
Cyrtandra baeotricha 
Cyrtandra baileyi 
Cyrtandra banyingii 
Cyrtandra barbata 
Cyrtandra barnesii 
Cyrtandra basiflora 
Cyrtandra × basipartita 
Cyrtandra bataanensis 
Cyrtandra bataviensis 
Cyrtandra beamanii 
Cyrtandra beccarii 
Cyrtandra beckmannii 
Cyrtandra begonioides 
Cyrtandra behrmanniana 
Cyrtandra benaratica 
Cyrtandra benguetiana 
Cyrtandra bicolor 
Cyrtandra bidwillii 
Cyrtandra biflora 
Cyrtandra biserrata 
Cyrtandra bismarckiensis 
Cyrtandra boliohutensis 
Cyrtandra bracheia 
Cyrtandra bracteata 
Cyrtandra brevicaulis 
Cyrtandra breviflora 
Cyrtandra brevisetosa 
Cyrtandra brownii 
Cyrtandra bruteliana 
Cyrtandra bryophila 
Cyrtandra buergersiana 
Cyrtandra bullata 
Cyrtandra bullifolia 
Cyrtandra bungahijau 
Cyrtandra burbidgei 
Cyrtandra burleyana 
Cyrtandra burttii 
Cyrtandra calciphila 
Cyrtandra callicarpifolia 
Cyrtandra calpidicarpa 
Cyrtandra calycina 
Cyrtandra calyptribracteata 
Cyrtandra campanulata 
Cyrtandra capitellata 
Cyrtandra × carinata 
Cyrtandra castatea 
Cyrtandra caudata 
Cyrtandra × caudatisepala 
Cyrtandra × caulescens 
Cyrtandra cauliflora 
Cyrtandra cephalophora 
Cyrtandra ceratocalyx 
Cyrtandra cerea 
Cyrtandra chaiana 
Cyrtandra chalcodea 
Cyrtandra chavis-insectorum 
Cyrtandra chippendalei 
Cyrtandra chiritoides 
Cyrtandra chlamydocalyx 
Cyrtandra chlorantha 
Cyrtandra × christophersenii 
Cyrtandra chrysalabastrum 
Cyrtandra chrysea 
Cyrtandra ciliata 
Cyrtandra × cladantha 
Cyrtandra clarkei 
Cyrtandra cleopatrae 
Cyrtandra coacta 
Cyrtandra coccinea 
Cyrtandra coleoides 
Cyrtandra cominsii 
Cyrtandra comocarpa 
Cyrtandra compressa 
Cyrtandra confertiflora 
Cyrtandra confusa 
Cyrtandra congestiflora 
Cyrtandra connata 
Cyrtandra × conradtii 
Cyrtandra consimilis 
Cyrtandra constricta 
Cyrtandra copelandii 
Cyrtandra cordifolia 
Cyrtandra coriaceifolia 
Cyrtandra corniculata 
Cyrtandra × crassifolia 
Cyrtandra × crassior 
Cyrtandra crenata 
Cyrtandra cretacea 
Cyrtandra crockerella 
Cyrtandra crockeriana 
Cyrtandra cryptantha 
Cyrtandra cumingii 
Cyrtandra cuneata 
Cyrtandra cuprea 
Cyrtandra cupulata 
Cyrtandra × cupuliformis 
Cyrtandra curranii 
Cyrtandra cyaneoides 
Cyrtandra cyathibracteata 
Cyrtandra cyclopum 
Cyrtandra cylindrocalyx 
Cyrtandra cymosa 
Cyrtandra dallasensis 
Cyrtandra dasymallos 
Cyrtandra davaoensis 
Cyrtandra debilis 
Cyrtandra decipiens 
Cyrtandra decurrens 
Cyrtandra decussata 
Cyrtandra deinandra 
Cyrtandra denhamii 
Cyrtandra dentata 
Cyrtandra detzneriana 
Cyrtandra digitaliflora 
Cyrtandra dilatata 
Cyrtandra dinocalyx 
Cyrtandra diplotricha 
Cyrtandra dispar 
Cyrtandra disparifolia 
Cyrtandra disparoides 
Cyrtandra dissimilis 
Cyrtandra disticha 
Cyrtandra divertae 
Cyrtandra dolichocalyx 
Cyrtandra dolichocarpa 
Cyrtandra dolichopoda 
Cyrtandra dorytricha 
Cyrtandra dubiosa 
Cyrtandra dulitiana 
Cyrtandra efatensis 
Cyrtandra elata 
Cyrtandra elatostemmoides 
Cyrtandra elbertii 
Cyrtandra elegans 
Cyrtandra elizabethae 
Cyrtandra elmeri 
Cyrtandra eminens 
Cyrtandra engleri 
Cyrtandra erectiloba 
Cyrtandra erectipila 
Cyrtandra eriantha 
Cyrtandra eriophylla 
Cyrtandra erythrotricha 
Cyrtandra esothrix 
Cyrtandra eximia 
Cyrtandra exserta 
Cyrtandra externata 
Cyrtandra falcata 
Cyrtandra falcifolia 
Cyrtandra farinosa 
Cyrtandra fasciata 
Cyrtandra feaniana 
Cyrtandra fenestrata 
Cyrtandra ferripilosa 
Cyrtandra × ferrocolorata 
Cyrtandra ferruginea 
Cyrtandra × ferruginosa 
Cyrtandra fiamoiensis 
Cyrtandra filibracteata 
Cyrtandra filipes 
Cyrtandra filisecta 
Cyrtandra flabellifolia 
Cyrtandra flabelligera 
Cyrtandra flavescens 
Cyrtandra flexiramea 
Cyrtandra floccosa 
Cyrtandra floribunda 
Cyrtandra florulenta 
Cyrtandra foliosa 
Cyrtandra × forbesii 
Cyrtandra foveolata 
Cyrtandra fragilis 
Cyrtandra frutescens 
Cyrtandra fulvisericea 
Cyrtandra fulvovillosa 
Cyrtandra funkii 
Cyrtandra fusconervia 
Cyrtandra fuscovellea 
Cyrtandra fuscovenosa 
Cyrtandra futunae 
Cyrtandra gambutensis 
Cyrtandra garnotiana 
Cyrtandra geantha 
Cyrtandra geesinkiana 
Cyrtandra geminata 
Cyrtandra geminiflora 
Cyrtandra geocarpa 
Cyrtandra × georgiata 
Cyrtandra gibbsiae 
Cyrtandra giffardii 
Cyrtandra gillettiana 
Cyrtandra gimlettii 
Cyrtandra gitingensis 
Cyrtandra gjellerupii 
Cyrtandra glabra 
Cyrtandra glabrifolia 
Cyrtandra glabrilimba 
Cyrtandra glaucescens 
Cyrtandra godeffroyi 
Cyrtandra gorontaloensis 
Cyrtandra gorumensis 
Cyrtandra gracilenta 
Cyrtandra gracilis 
Cyrtandra graeffei 
Cyrtandra grandibracteata 
Cyrtandra grandiflora 
Cyrtandra grandifolia 
Cyrtandra grandis 
Cyrtandra grayana 
Cyrtandra grayi 
Cyrtandra gregoryi 
Cyrtandra grossedentata 
Cyrtandra guerkeana 
Cyrtandra halawensis 
Cyrtandra hansenii 
Cyrtandra hapalantha 
Cyrtandra harveyi 
Cyrtandra hashimotoi 
Cyrtandra hawaiensis 
Cyrtandra hedraiantha 
Cyrtandra heineana 
Cyrtandra heinrichii 
Cyrtandra heintzelmaniana 
Cyrtandra hekensis 
Cyrtandra hellwigii 
Cyrtandra hematos 
Cyrtandra hendrianii 
Cyrtandra herbacea 
Cyrtandra heteronema 
Cyrtandra heterophylla 
Cyrtandra hiranoi 
Cyrtandra hirsuta 
Cyrtandra hirta 
Cyrtandra hirtigera 
Cyrtandra hispida 
Cyrtandra hispidissima 
Cyrtandra hispidula 
Cyrtandra holodasys 
Cyrtandra hololeuca 
Cyrtandra homoplastica 
Cyrtandra × honolulensis 
Cyrtandra horizontalis 
Cyrtandra hornei 
Cyrtandra × hosakae 
Cyrtandra hoseana 
Cyrtandra hottae 
Cyrtandra hufnagelii 
Cyrtandra humilis 
Cyrtandra hypochrysea 
Cyrtandra hypochrysoides 
Cyrtandra hypogaea 
Cyrtandra hypoleuca 
Cyrtandra iliasii 
Cyrtandra ilicifolia 
Cyrtandra ilocana 
Cyrtandra imminuta 
Cyrtandra impar 
Cyrtandra impressivenia 
Cyrtandra inaequifolia 
Cyrtandra incisa 
Cyrtandra incompta 
Cyrtandra incrustata 
Cyrtandra induta 
Cyrtandra infantae 
Cyrtandra insignis 
Cyrtandra insolita 
Cyrtandra insularis 
Cyrtandra integerrima 
Cyrtandra integrifolia 
Cyrtandra involucrata 
Cyrtandra jabiensis 
Cyrtandra jadunae 
Cyrtandra janowskyi 
Cyrtandra jellesmani 
Cyrtandra jonesii 
Cyrtandra jugalis 
Cyrtandra × kaalae 
Cyrtandra × kahanaensis 
Cyrtandra kajewskii 
Cyrtandra kalihii 
Cyrtandra kalimantana 
Cyrtandra kalyptantha 
Cyrtandra kamoolaensis 
Cyrtandra kanae 
Cyrtandra kandavuensis 
Cyrtandra kaniensis 
Cyrtandra kauaiensis 
Cyrtandra kaulantha 
Cyrtandra kealiae 
Cyrtandra keithii 
Cyrtandra kenivensis 
Cyrtandra kenwoodii 
Cyrtandra kermesina 
Cyrtandra kinhoi 
Cyrtandra × kipahuluensis 
Cyrtandra × kipapaensis 
Cyrtandra kjellbergii 
Cyrtandra klossii 
Cyrtandra kohalae 
Cyrtandra kostermansii 
Cyrtandra kraemeri 
Cyrtandra kruegeri 
Cyrtandra kusaimontana 
Cyrtandra labiosa 
Cyrtandra lacerata 
Cyrtandra laciniata 
Cyrtandra × laevis 
Cyrtandra lagunae 
Cyrtandra lambirensis 
Cyrtandra lanata 
Cyrtandra lanceolata 
Cyrtandra lanceolifera 
Cyrtandra lancifolia 
Cyrtandra lasiantha 
Cyrtandra lasiogyne 
Cyrtandra latibracteata 
Cyrtandra laxa 
Cyrtandra laxiflora 
Cyrtandra ledermannii 
Cyrtandra leiocrater 
Cyrtandra lessoniana 
Cyrtandra leucantha 
Cyrtandra leucochlamys 
Cyrtandra libauensis 
Cyrtandra ligulifera 
Cyrtandra lillianae 
Cyrtandra limnophila 
Cyrtandra linauana 
Cyrtandra lineariloba 
Cyrtandra lithophila 
Cyrtandra livida 
Cyrtandra lobbii 
Cyrtandra locuples 
Cyrtandra loheri 
Cyrtandra longe-petiolata 
Cyrtandra longicarpa 
Cyrtandra longiflora 
Cyrtandra longifolia 
Cyrtandra longifruticosa 
Cyrtandra longipedunculata 
Cyrtandra longipes 
Cyrtandra longirostris 
Cyrtandra lorentzii 
Cyrtandra luteiflora 
Cyrtandra lutescens 
Cyrtandra lydgatei 
Cyrtandra lysiosepala 
Cyrtandra macraei 
Cyrtandra macrobracteata 
Cyrtandra macrocalyx 
Cyrtandra macrodiscus 
Cyrtandra macrophylla 
Cyrtandra macrotricha 
Cyrtandra maculata 
Cyrtandra maesifolia 
Cyrtandra magentiflora 
Cyrtandra magnoliifolia 
Cyrtandra × malacophylla 
Cyrtandra mamolea 
Cyrtandra × mannii 
Cyrtandra maquilingensis 
Cyrtandra mareensis 
Cyrtandra marthae 
Cyrtandra martini 
Cyrtandra mcgregorii 
Cyrtandra megalocalyx 
Cyrtandra megalocrater 
Cyrtandra megaphylla 
Cyrtandra melinocalyx 
Cyrtandra membranacea 
Cyrtandra membranifolia 
Cyrtandra mendumae 
Cyrtandra menziesii 
Cyrtandra mesilauensis 
Cyrtandra micrantha 
Cyrtandra microcalyx 
Cyrtandra microcarpa 
Cyrtandra microphylla 
Cyrtandra milnei 
Cyrtandra mindanaensis 
Cyrtandra minjemensis 
Cyrtandra minor 
Cyrtandra mirabilis 
Cyrtandra miserrima 
Cyrtandra mollis 
Cyrtandra montana 
Cyrtandra monticola 
Cyrtandra montigena 
Cyrtandra mooreaensis 
Cyrtandra mucronata 
Cyrtandra mucronatisepala 
Cyrtandra multibracteata 
Cyrtandra multicaulis 
Cyrtandra multifolia 
Cyrtandra multinervis 
Cyrtandra multiseptata 
Cyrtandra muluensis 
Cyrtandra munroi 
Cyrtandra muskarimba 
Cyrtandra nabirensis 
Cyrtandra nadeaudii 
Cyrtandra nana 
Cyrtandra nanawaleensis 
Cyrtandra natewaensis 
Cyrtandra navicellata 
Cyrtandra neiothiantha 
Cyrtandra nemorosa 
Cyrtandra neohebridensis 
Cyrtandra nervosa 
Cyrtandra nibongensis 
Cyrtandra nitens 
Cyrtandra nitida 
Cyrtandra nodulosa 
Cyrtandra nudiflora 
Cyrtandra nukuhivensis 
Cyrtandra × nutans 
Cyrtandra oblongata 
Cyrtandra oblongifolia 
Cyrtandra obovata 
Cyrtandra occidentalis 
Cyrtandra occulta 
Cyrtandra ochroleuca 
Cyrtandra oenobarba 
Cyrtandra oligantha 
Cyrtandra olona 
Cyrtandra ootensis 
Cyrtandra × opaeulae 
Cyrtandra oreogiton 
Cyrtandra oxybapha 
Cyrtandra pachyneura 
Cyrtandra pachyphylla 
Cyrtandra palawensis 
Cyrtandra paliku 
Cyrtandra palimasanica 
Cyrtandra pallida 
Cyrtandra pallidifolia 
Cyrtandra paludosa 
Cyrtandra panayensis 
Cyrtandra pandurata 
Cyrtandra pantothrix 
Cyrtandra papyracea 
Cyrtandra paragibbsiae 
Cyrtandra paravelutina 
Cyrtandra parva 
Cyrtandra parviflora 
Cyrtandra parvifolia 
Cyrtandra parvifructa 
Cyrtandra patentiserrata 
Cyrtandra patula 
Cyrtandra pauciflora 
Cyrtandra paxiana 
Cyrtandra pedicellata 
Cyrtandra peltata 
Cyrtandra pendula 
Cyrtandra penduliflora 
Cyrtandra perplexa 
Cyrtandra phaeodictyon 
Cyrtandra philippinensis 
Cyrtandra phoenicea 
Cyrtandra phoenicoides 
Cyrtandra phoenicolasia 
Cyrtandra pickeringii 
Cyrtandra picta 
Cyrtandra pilosa 
Cyrtandra pilostila 
Cyrtandra pinatubensis 
Cyrtandra platyphylla 
Cyrtandra plectranthiflora 
Cyrtandra plicata 
Cyrtandra pogonantha 
Cyrtandra poiensis 
Cyrtandra poikilophylla 
Cyrtandra polyantha 
Cyrtandra polyneura 
Cyrtandra ponapensis 
Cyrtandra populifolia 
Cyrtandra poulsenii 
Cyrtandra prattii 
Cyrtandra pritchardii 
Cyrtandra procera 
Cyrtandra propinqua 
Cyrtandra prostrata 
Cyrtandra pruinosa 
Cyrtandra × pubens 
Cyrtandra pulchella 
Cyrtandra pulgarensis 
Cyrtandra pulleana 
Cyrtandra pumilio 
Cyrtandra punctatissima 
Cyrtandra purpurea 
Cyrtandra purpureofucata 
Cyrtandra purpurifolia 
Cyrtandra quercifolia 
Cyrtandra quinquenotata 
Cyrtandra quisumbingii 
Cyrtandra radiciflora 
Cyrtandra raiateensis 
Cyrtandra ramiflora 
Cyrtandra ramosii 
Cyrtandra × ramosissima 
Cyrtandra ramunculosa 
Cyrtandra rantemarioensis 
Cyrtandra rarotongensis 
Cyrtandra reinwardtii 
Cyrtandra repens 
Cyrtandra reticosa 
Cyrtandra reticulata 
Cyrtandra revoluta 
Cyrtandra rhabdothamnos 
Cyrtandra rhizantha 
Cyrtandra rhizautha 
Cyrtandra rhyncanthera 
Cyrtandra richii 
Cyrtandra rivularis 
Cyrtandra robusta 
Cyrtandra × rockii 
Cyrtandra roemeri 
Cyrtandra rosea 
Cyrtandra roseiflora 
Cyrtandra roseoalba 
Cyrtandra rostrata 
Cyrtandra rotumaensis 
Cyrtandra rubiginosa 
Cyrtandra rubra 
Cyrtandra rubribracteata 
Cyrtandra rubricalyx 
Cyrtandra rubropicta 
Cyrtandra rufa 
Cyrtandra rufotricha 
Cyrtandra rupicola 
Cyrtandra russa 
Cyrtandra sagetorum 
Cyrtandra saligna 
Cyrtandra samoensis 
Cyrtandra sandakanensis 
Cyrtandra sandei 
Cyrtandra sandwicensis 
Cyrtandra saniensis 
Cyrtandra santosii 
Cyrtandra sarawakensis 
Cyrtandra saxicola 
Cyrtandra × scabrella 
Cyrtandra scandens 
Cyrtandra schizocalyx 
Cyrtandra schizostyla 
Cyrtandra schraderi 
Cyrtandra schultzei 
Cyrtandra schumanniana 
Cyrtandra scutata 
Cyrtandra scutifolia 
Cyrtandra seganica 
Cyrtandra sepikana 
Cyrtandra sericifolia 
Cyrtandra serratifolia 
Cyrtandra serratobracteata 
Cyrtandra sessilis 
Cyrtandra sibuyanensis 
Cyrtandra similis 
Cyrtandra simplex 
Cyrtandra sinclairiana 
Cyrtandra smithiana 
Cyrtandra sororia 
Cyrtandra sorsogonensis 
Cyrtandra spathacea 
Cyrtandra spathulata 
Cyrtandra spectabilis 
Cyrtandra spelaea 
Cyrtandra sphaerocalyx 
Cyrtandra spicata 
Cyrtandra splendens 
Cyrtandra stenophylla 
Cyrtandra stenoptera 
Cyrtandra stolleana 
Cyrtandra stonei 
Cyrtandra strictipes 
Cyrtandra strongiana 
Cyrtandra suberosa 
Cyrtandra subglabra 
Cyrtandra subgrandis 
Cyrtandra × subintegra 
Cyrtandra sublanea 
Cyrtandra subsphaerocarpa 
Cyrtandra subulibractea 
Cyrtandra subumbellata 
Cyrtandra suffruticosa 
Cyrtandra sulcata 
Cyrtandra tagaleurium 
Cyrtandra tahuatensis 
Cyrtandra taitensis 
Cyrtandra talonensis 
Cyrtandra tarsodes 
Cyrtandra taviunensis 
Cyrtandra tayabensis 
Cyrtandra tecomiflora 
Cyrtandra tempestii 
Cyrtandra tenebrosa 
Cyrtandra tenuicarpa 
Cyrtandra tenuipes 
Cyrtandra tenuisepala 
Cyrtandra teres 
Cyrtandra terrae-guilelmi 
Cyrtandra tesselata 
Cyrtandra teysmannii 
Cyrtandra thamnodes 
Cyrtandra thibaultii 
Cyrtandra tibangensis 
Cyrtandra tintinnabula 
Cyrtandra todaiensis 
Cyrtandra tohiveaensis 
Cyrtandra tomentosa 
Cyrtandra toreniiflora 
Cyrtandra toviana 
Cyrtandra trachycaulis 
Cyrtandra treubiana 
Cyrtandra trichocalyx 
Cyrtandra trichodon 
Cyrtandra trichophylla 
Cyrtandra trisepala 
Cyrtandra trivialis 
Cyrtandra tubibractea 
Cyrtandra tubiflora 
Cyrtandra tuiwawae 
Cyrtandra tunohica 
Cyrtandra × turbiniformis 
Cyrtandra uahukaensis 
Cyrtandra uapouensis 
Cyrtandra umbellifera 
Cyrtandra × umbraculiflora 
Cyrtandra umbraticola 
Cyrtandra undata 
Cyrtandra uniflora 
Cyrtandra urceolata 
Cyrtandra urdanetensis 
Cyrtandra urvillei 
Cyrtandra vaginata 
Cyrtandra vairiae 
Cyrtandra valviloba 
Cyrtandra vanoverberghii 
Cyrtandra vaupelii 
Cyrtandra velutina 
Cyrtandra ventricosa 
Cyrtandra verrucosissima 
Cyrtandra versteegii 
Cyrtandra vescoi 
Cyrtandra vesiculata 
Cyrtandra vespertina 
Cyrtandra vestita 
Cyrtandra victoriae 
Cyrtandra × villicalyx 
Cyrtandra villifructus 
Cyrtandra villosissima 
Cyrtandra virescens 
Cyrtandra viridescens 
Cyrtandra viridiflora 
Cyrtandra vitiensis 
Cyrtandra vittata 
Cyrtandra vriesii 
Cyrtandra vulpina 
Cyrtandra wagneri 
Cyrtandra waianaeensis 
Cyrtandra wainihaensis 
Cyrtandra waiolani 
Cyrtandra waisaliensis 
Cyrtandra wallichii 
Cyrtandra warburgiana 
Cyrtandra wariana 
Cyrtandra wawrae 
Cyrtandra weberi 
Cyrtandra wentiana 
Cyrtandra wenzelii 
Cyrtandra wichmanniana 
Cyrtandra widjajae 
Cyrtandra wilhelmensis 
Cyrtandra williamsii 
Cyrtandra winkleri 
Cyrtandra wollastonii 
Cyrtandra woodsii 
Cyrtandra xanthantha 
Cyrtandra yaeyamae 
Cyrtandra zamboangensis 
Cyrtandra zippelii 
Cyrtandra zollingeri

References

Cyrtandra